is a 2018 Japanese animated action fantasy film based on the Pretty Cure franchise created by Izumi Todo. The film is directed by Yoko Ikeda, written by Shōji Yonemura, and produced by Toei Animation. The film was released in Japan on March 17, 2018.

Marking the tenth entry to the Pretty Cure All Stars crossover film series, the Hug! Pretty Cure team joins forces with Witchy PreCure! and Kirakira Pretty Cure a la Mode teams to stop a rampaging monster named Usobakka.

Plot
The Hug! Pretty Cure team: Hana, Saaya, and Homare encounters a mysterious rampaging monster named Usobakka while flower viewing. As they transform and fight, Usobakka turns their transformation devices into stones and reverts their transformations. As Usobakka kidnaps Saaya and Homare, Hana proposes to seek help from other Pretty Cures. Few hours later, Hana encounters the Kirakira Pretty Cure a la Mode team: Ichika, Himari, Aoi, Yukari, Akira and Ciel after they rescue Hugtan from a stroller. Usobakka appears again, and like from before, he turns their transformation devices into stones and kidnaps the Kirakira team but Ichika.

Ichika and Hana goes to the Magic World, where they try to alert the Witchy PreCure! team: Mirai, Riko and Ha-chan about Usobakka, but he appears once again and kidnaps Riko and Ha-chan. As the three girls escape, Hana reveals that the monster was known as a boy named Clover, as she had befriended him as a child and couldn't fulfill her promise to see him again. Meanwhile, the other trapped girls meet up with Saaya and Homare, whom realizes that they are slowly being turned into stones. Mirai proposes to Hana to find the Door of Time to prevent and save Clover from being turned into Usobakka. As they find and enter the door, Hana apologizes to Clover, and rescues him by exiting his world.

As Clover realizes that his partner, Dark Onibi had deceived him, Onibi reveals his true intentions and turns into a gigantic monster. To make up for his mistakes, Clover uses his powers to reunite the three Pretty Cure teams and restore their transformation items. The Cures transforms and fight Dark Onibi, but are bested, even with Kirakira and Witchy teams' powerful state. Clover then uses last of his powers to aid the Pretty Cures, and with the additional aid of the Miracle Lights, they attack Onibi with "Pretty Cure Clover Formation" attack. As Onibi is cured, Clover takes his flames with him to the afterlife, but not before making another promise with Yell.

Voice cast
Hug! Pretty Cure cast
Rie Hikisaka as Hana Nono/Cure Yell
Rina Honnizumi as Saaya Yakushiji/Cure Ange
Yui Ogura as Homare Kagayaki/Cure Etoile
Konomi Tada as Hugtan
Junko Noda as Hariham Harry
Jun Fukushima as Hariham's human form

Kirakira Pretty Cure a la Mode cast
Karen Miyama as Ichika Usami/Cure Whip
Haruka Fukuhara as Himari Arisugawa/Cure Custard
Tomo Muranaka as Aoi Tategami/Cure Gelato
Saki Fujita as Yukari Kotozume/Cure Macaron
Nanako Mori as Akira Tenjō/Cure Chocolat
Inori Minase as Kirarin/Ciel Kirahoshi/Cure Parfait
Mika Kanai as Pekorin

Witchy PreCure! cast
Rie Takahashi as Mirai Asahina/Cure Miracle
Yui Horie as Riko Izayoi/Cure Magical
Saori Hayami as Kotoha Hanami/Cure Felice
Ayaka Saitō as Mofurun

Film characters
Kensho Ono as Clover
Kazuki Kitamura as Usobakka 
 Kitamura also voices Dark Onibi

Production
The new Pretty Cure All Stars crossover film was announced in January 2018. Pretty Cure episode director Yoko Ikeda directed the film, with screenplay by Shōji Yonemura, whom was in charge of writing Smile PreCure! series, and character design and chief animation direction by Hisashi Kagawa, whom previously designed Fresh Pretty Cure! series. Kazuki Kitamura and Kensho Ono was announced to voice the original film characters; Usobakka and Clover respectively.

Release
The film was released in theaters in Japan on March 17, 2018.

Reception

Box office
The film opened at number 3 out of top 10 in the Japanese box office in its opening week, and consistently stayed on the charts the following weeks.

References

External links
 

Pretty Cure films
Toei Animation films
Films scored by Yuki Hayashi
2018 films
Japanese magical girl films
2010s Japanese films
2018 anime films
Crossover anime and manga